Luigina Bissoli (born 21 January 1956) is a retired Italian cyclist. She won two silver and two bronze medals at the road and track world championships. Nationally, she won thirteen titles on track and two on the road, in 1975 and 1977. In December 1978 she set three world records, in the 200, 500 and 1,000 m sprint.

References

External links

1956 births
Living people
Italian female cyclists
Cyclists from the Province of Padua